Fuling District is a district in central Chongqing, China. As the second largest city in Chongqing, the area is known for zha cai, a hot pickled mustard tuber, as well as serving as the location of former U.S. Peace Corps teacher Peter Hessler's best-selling memoir River Town: Two Years on the Yangtze.

The district's area spans from  latitude 29°21' to 30°01' north, and longitude 106°56' to 107°43' east.

History
According to the district's government, the area comprising contemporary Fuling District has been inhabited since approximately 3000 BCE.

From the middle and late part of Spring and Autumn period, through to the middle of the Warring States period, the area belonged to the State of Ba. The area was at some point the site of one of the Ba's capitals, and a Ba king is buried within the area. During the middle and latter part of the Warring States period, the area belonged to the State of Chu.

During the Eastern Han, Zhi County was merged into .

In the Three Kingdoms period, the area was ruled by the Shu Han, and organized as Hanping County.

In 347 CE, under the Eastern Jin, the area was again reorganized as Fu Commandery, which was also known as Zhicheng Commandery.

The area's administrative divisions were reorganized dramatically during the Northern and Southern dynasties.

During the Southern Song, Fu Zhou was reestablished to govern the area, and administered Fuling County and Wulong County.

Fu Zhou remained intact during the Yuan dynasty and the Ming dynasty, and governed Wulong County. Fu Zhou would continue intact during the Qing dynasty, but was not divided into counties.

In 1913, shortly after the establishment of the Republic of China, Fu Zhou was reorganized as Fuling County.

Following the establishment of the People's Republic of China, the area saw administrative reforms in early 1950. Fuling Area governed seven counties: Fuling, Nanchuan, Fengdu, Shizhu, Wulong, Changshou and Pengshui. In  1952,  was merged into Fuling Area, adding the counties of Dianjiang, Qianjiang, Youyang, and Xiushan. Changshou County was absorbed into Chongqing, which then had a prefecture-level status instead of its present provincial-level status, in 1958. Fuling County became a county-level city in 1983. The prefecture became a Three Gorges provincial planning region the following year. In 1988, Qianjiang, Youyang, Xiushan, Pengshui, and Shizhu counties were transferred to the jurisdiction of the newly-organized . Nanchuan County was re-designated as a county-level city in 1994. On November 5, 1995, the State Council passed legislation to abolish the county-level city of Fuling and replace it with two districts: Zhicheng District and Lidu District. This change would come into effect in January 1996. In March 1996, Fuling Prefecture was re-designated as a prefecture-level city, which governed Zhicheng District, Lidu District, Nanchuan City, Dianjiang County, Fengdu County and Wulong County.

On September 15, 1996, legislature passed by the State Council placed the prefecture-level city of Fuling under the administration of Chongqing. On March 14, 1997, the National People's Congress changed Chongqing to become a direct-administered municipality. This was followed by legislation by the State Council on December 20, 1997 which abolished Fuling's prefecture-level status, revoking Zhicheng District and Lidu District, and placing Nanchuan City, Wulong County, Fengdu County, and Dianjiang County all under the direct jurisdiction of Chongqing. The now-defunct Zhicheng District and Lidu District became contemporary Fuling District.

Geography 
Fuling City is located at the confluence of the Wu River and the Yangtze, in the heart of the Three Gorges Reservoir Region.

Located in the central part of Chongqing, Fuling District is bordered by Fengdu County to the east, Wulong District and Nanchuan District to the south, Banan District to the west, and Changshou District and Dianjiang County to the north.

Climate 
Fuling District has a monsoon-influenced humid subtropical climate (Köppen Cwa), with four distinct seasons and ample rainfall: winters are short, mild, and comparatively dry, while summers are long, hot, and humid. Around 87% of the annual precipitation falls from April to October.

Demographics

Fuling District has a population of 1,115,016, according to the 2020 Chinese Census. This represents a 4.53% increase from the 1,066,714 recorded in the 2010 Chinese Census.

As of 2020, 71.85% of the district's population is urbanized, up from 55.80% in 2010.

Age and household structure 
14.93% of the district's population is 14 years old or younger, 63.91% is between 15 and 59 years old, and 21.16% is 60 years old or older. 18.02% of the district's population is 65 years or older. Compared to 2010, the proportion of people age 14 or younger dropped 0.96%, the proportion of people age 15 to 59 fell 2.10%, and the proportion of people age 60 or older rose 3.06%. The proportion of people age 65 or older rose 5.63% from 2010 to 2020. The average household size in Fuling District totaled 2.44 people, a decrease from the 2.91 size recorded in 2010.

Educational attainment 
12.85% of the district's population had attained a tertiary education, according to 2020 figures. An additional 16.97% of the district's population had attained a secondary education, an additional 34.88% attained a junior high education, an additional 28.44% attained a primary education, and the remaining 6.86% of the population had no formal education. People above the age of 14 in the district have attained an average of 9.68 years of formal education, an increase from the 8.73 years average recorded in 2010. Fuling District had a literacy rate of 98.57% as of 2020, an increase from 94.82% in 2010.

Administrative divisions
Fuling District administers 11 subdistricts, 14 towns, and 2 townships. These township-level divisions in turn administer 719 administrative villages and 80 residential communities.

2010 divisions

Economy 
Fuling District had a total gross domestic product (GDP) of 140.274 billion renminbi (RMB) as of 2021, an 8.7% increase from 2020.

The district's primary sector accounted for 6.48% of total GDP in 2021, and grew at a rate of 6.4% from 2020; the secondary sector accounted for 55.80% of GDP, and grew 6.7% from 2020; the tertiary sector accounted for 37.72% of GDP, and grew 12.0% from 2020.

Transportation
Historically, Fuling was primarily served by Yangtze river boats, as the development of ground transportation was slow, due to the difficult terrain.

Railways arrived to the Fuling area only in the 21st century.  First was the  Chongqing–Huaihua Railway, completed in 2005. Its Fuling Railway Station is located a few kilometers west of town.

The high-speed Chongqing−Lichuan Railway, opened on December 28, 2013, serves Fuling as well, with its Fuling North Railway Station. This railway crosses the Yangtze near the city over the Hanjiatuo Bridge. The railway's Caijiagou Bridge, located in Fuling District, is said to be the world's tallest railway bridge, as measured by the height of the bridge's tallest pillar (139 m).  The Nanchuan–Fuling Railway, completed in 2012, forms part of Chongqing's outer railway ring.

As of 2015, Fuling had five Yangtze River bridges.

Education

Yangtze Normal University (formerly Fuling Teachers College) is in Fuling. The university hosted Peace Corps volunteers from 1996 until 2020, when the last volunteers were evacuated from the Peace Corps China program in the wake of COVID-19.

Culture

The White Crane Ridge (Baiheliang), a rock outcrop on the Yangtze River, has been used as a hydrological station recording water levels since the Tang Dynasty. It includes many rock carvings. With the flooding of the Yangtze as part of the Three Gorges Dam project, the White Crane Ridge Underwater Museum was opened in 2009 to protect the carvings and allow viewing by visitors under the new water level of the river.

Cuisine 
Fuling is well known for its Wu River brand zha cai pickled mustard tuber.  The Fuling Zhacai company is listed on the Shenzhen Stock Exchange, and in 2021 celebrated selling 15 billion packets.

According to Peter Hessler, as of 1998, most residents of Fuling are genetically incapable of being alcoholics. When imbibing large amounts of alcohol many people became so sick and they could not drink heavily all the time. Therefore, according to Hessler, consumption of alcohol was not habitual but instead was a ritual, and therefore drinking patterns were "abusive with light consequences."

See also 
River Town: Two Years on the Yangtze
Fuling Catholic Church
White Crane Ridge
Baiheliang Underwater Museum
816 Nuclear Military Plant

Notes

Bibliography
 Hessler, Peter. River Town: Two Years on the Yangtze (ebook edition). HarperCollins e-books.

External links

 Official site 

Districts of Chongqing